Saaristoa sammamish is a species of sheetweb spider in the family Linyphiidae. It is found in the United States.

References

Linyphiidae
Spiders of the United States
Endemic fauna of the United States
Spiders described in 1955
Articles created by Qbugbot